
Year 405 (CDV) was a common year starting on Sunday (link will display the full calendar) of the Julian calendar. At the time, it was known as the Year of the Consulship of Stilicho and Anthemius (or, less frequently, year 1158 Ab urbe condita). The denomination 405 for this year has been used since the early medieval period, when the Anno Domini calendar era became the prevalent method in Europe for naming years.

Events 
 By place 

 Roman Empire 
 Emperor Honorius closes the Flavian Amphitheatre (Colosseum), in an austerity move that abolishes amusements.
 Stilicho, Roman general (magister militum), orders the Sibylline Books to be burned, according to the Roman poet Rutilius Claudius Namatianus.
 Stilicho crushes a coalition of Asding Vandals, Ostrogoths and Quadi with an army raised from forces of the Rhine frontier, leaving this sector dangerously weakened.
 King Radagaisus leads an invasion with a force of 20,000 men and crosses the Alps. He spends the winter in the Po Valley and is observed by Stilicho, who lacks sufficient strength to prepare an offensive against the invading German tribes. The exact numbers of the migration are unknown, probably nearly 100,000, including Alans, Burgundians, Goths, Vandals, and other smaller tribes.
 Flavius Aetius is sent as a child hostage at the court of Alaric I, king of the Visigoths.

 Asia 
 The Khitan are first mentioned in Chinese chronicles. They wander along the boundaries of Kara-muren, and form part of the Donghu (Tong-hou) confederation.
 Jeonji becomes king of the Korean kingdom of Baekje.

 By topic 

 Arts and Sciences 
 The Armenian alphabet is devised by Mesrop Mashtots.
 The Japanese court officially adopts the Chinese writing system (approximate date).
 Theon of Alexandria, Greek mathematician, dies at age 70 (approximate), having been helped in his work by his daughter Hypatia.

 Religion 
 Jerome's Vulgate translation of the Bible into Latin is completed by his translations of the Tanakh from the Hebrew language.
 In the Roman province of Africa, Augustine of Hippo opposes Donatism as a heresy.

Births 
 Ricimer, de facto ruler of the Western Roman Empire (approximate date)
 Salvian, Christian writer (approximate date)
 Yuan Qigui, empress and wife of Wen of Liu Song (d. 440)

Deaths 
 June 26 – Saint Vigilius, bishop of Trent (b. 353)
 November 11 – Arsacius of Tarsus, archbishop of Constantinople
 Moses the Black, Christian monk and priest (b. 330)
 Murong De, emperor of the Xianbei state Southern Yan (b. 336)
 Richu, emperor of Japan (approximate date)
 Theon of Alexandria, last director of the Library of Alexandria (approximate date)

References